Hartwig Löger (born 15 July 1965) is an Austrian politician and former business executive who served as minister of finance from 2017 to 2019. From 2011 to 2017 he was chief executive officer of UNIQA Austria. On 22 May 2019, following the Ibiza affair, he was named vice chancellor, and on 28 May 2019, he was sworn in as acting chancellor after Austria's first ever successful vote of no confidence against a cabinet, leaving this post on 3 June 2019.

Early life and education 
Löger was born in Selzthal in Styria and graduated in 1983 at the Stiftsgymnasium Admont. Originally striving for a career as pilot, Löger started an Offiziersanwärterausbildung at the Bundesheer and made the pilots entrance exam there. Because of a knee injury Löger failed the exam and randomly ended up in the insurance branch. 1987/88 he started visiting a course for insurance economy at the Vienna University of Economics and Business and from 1999 to 2001 he completed an international management course (IMEA) at the University of St. Gallen.

Career 
From 1985 to 1989 Löger worked as a customer adviser for an insurance agent. Subsequently, he started working for Allianz until 1996 as sales manager for the region Styria, then as assistant to the management at the Grazer Wechselseitige and until 2002 as sales manager at the Donau Versicherung AG. From 2002 to 2017 he worked for the Uniqa Insurance Group, first as managing director of the UNIQA International Versicherungs-Holding GmbH and later, until 2011, as head of the exclusive sales department. In 2011 he became a senior corporate officer at UNIQA and the chief executive officer of UNIQA Austria. In December 2017 he was succeeded as CEO by Kurt Svoboda.

From 2014 to February 2018 Löger served as president of the Sports Union. Since 2011 he has been a member of the Vienna state institutions of the People's Party Business Union.

Political career 
Löger served as Minister of Finance in the coalition government of Chancellor Sebastian Kurz. He was nominated by the People's Party for this position.

Alongside Gernot Blümel, Günther Helm (Hofer KG) und Wolfgang Leitner, Löger has been serving as member of the nominating committee of the Industrieholding since January 2018. The committee decides who is sent to the supervisory board of companies with state share participation.

Other activities

European Union organizations
 European Investment Bank (EIB), Ex-Officio Member of the Board of Governors (2018–2019)
 European Stability Mechanism (ESM), Member of the Board of Governors (2018–2019)

International organizations
 Asian Development Bank (ADB), Ex-Officio Member of the Board of Governors (2018–2019)
 Asian Infrastructure Investment Bank (AIIB), Ex-Officio Member of the Board of Governors (2018–2019)
 European Bank for Reconstruction and Development (EBRD), Ex-Officio Member of the Board of Governors (2018–2019)
 Inter-American Investment Corporation (IIC), Ex-Officio Member of the Board of Governors (2018–2019)
 Multilateral Investment Guarantee Agency (MIGA), World Bank Group, Ex-Officio Member of the Board of Governors (2018–2019
 World Bank, Ex-Officio Member of the Board of Governors (2018–2019)

Non-profit organizations
 Kunsthistorisches Museum, President of the Circle of Friends
 KURIER Aid Austria, Vice President
 Verband der Versicherungsunternehmen Österreichs (VVO), Vice President

Personal life
Löger is married, has two children and lives in Vienna in Austria.

References

External links

 
 BMF: Minister of Finance Hartwig Löger
 Hartwig Löger on www.meineabgeordneten.at

1965 births
Living people
21st-century Chancellors of Austria
Austrian People's Party politicians
Finance Ministers of Austria
People from Liezen District
Vienna University of Economics and Business alumni
University of St. Gallen alumni
Vice-Chancellors of Austria
21st-century Austrian politicians